Olenecamptus formosanus is a species of beetle in the family Cerambycidae. It was described by Maurice Pic in 1914. It contains the varietas Olenecamptus formosanus var. decemmaculatus. It occurs in East Asia (Taiwan, Korea, Japan).

References

Dorcaschematini
Beetles of Asia
Insects of Japan
Insects of Korea
Insects of Taiwan
Beetles described in 1914
Taxa named by Maurice Pic